Hippeastrum aulicum, the Lily of the Palace,  is a bulbous perennial, in the family Amaryllidaceae, native to the Atlantic Forest and Cerrado ecoregions from Brazil to Paraguay, in South America.

Description
Hippeastrum aulicum is a bulbous epiphyte, growing on rocks and trees which has large scarlet flowers with a green throat, usually with four flowers to a stem. It blooms in late summer and autumn.

Taxonomy 
Hippeastrum aulicum was first described by Ker Gawler in 1883.

Synonyms 
See The Plant List

 Amaryllis aulica Ker Gawl.
 Amaryllis aulica var. platypetala Lindl.
 Amaryllis heuseriana (H.Karst.) Ravenna
 Amaryllis heuseriana f. campanulata Ravenna
 Amaryllis robusta Otto & A.Dietr. [Illegitimate]
 Amaryllis rougieri Carrière
 Amaryllis tettanii auct.
 Aulica latifolia Raf.
 Aulica platypetala (Lindl.) Raf.
 Aulica striata Raf.
 Hippeastrum aulicum var. platypetalum (Lindl.) Herb.
 Hippeastrum aulicum f. robustum (A.Dietr. ex Walp.) Voss
 Hippeastrum heuserianum H.Karst.
 Hippeastrum robustum A.Dietr. ex Walp.
 Hippeastrum tweedianum Herb.
 Omphalissa aulica (Ker Gawl.) Salisb.
 Trisacarpis rubra Raf.

Etymology 
The species name aulicum comes from the Latin, meaning 'princely'.

Cultivation
Hippeastrum aulicum is cultivated by specialty flower bulb nurseries as an ornamental plant.

References

Sources 

 
 Zuloaga, F. O., O. Morrone, M. J. Belgrano, C. Marticorena & E. Marchesi. (eds.) 2008. Catálogo de las Plantas Vasculares del Cono Sur (Argentina, Sur de Brasil, Chile, Paraguay y Uruguay). Monogr. Syst. Bot. Missouri Bot. Gard. 107(1): i–xcvi, 1–983; 107(2): i–xx, 985–2286; 107(3): i–xxi, 2287–3348.

aulicum
Flora of Brazil
Flora of the Cerrado
Flora of the Atlantic Forest
Plants described in 1783
Garden plants of South America